Vermont Route 104 (VT 104) is a state highway in the U.S. state of Vermont. The highway runs  from VT 15 in Cambridge to VT 105 in the town of St. Albans. VT 104 is an L-shaped route that connects the city of St. Albans and Cambridge via Fairfax. The highway has an auxiliary route, VT 104A, that connects Fairfax and Georgia to the west.

Route description
VT 104 begins at an intersection with VT 15 in the town of Cambridge. The two-lane highway heads west parallel to the Lamoille River and crosses the Lamoille–Franklin county line into the town of Fairfax, where the highway is named Main Street. VT 104 crosses Beaver Creek and continues west between the south town line and the river to the north. South of the center of town, the highway curves north and meets the northern end of VT 128 (Browns River Road) at a tangent intersection. VT 104 passes through the town center between its bridges over the Lamoille River and Mill Brook; just south of the latter bridge, the route intersects Maple Street, which leads to the Maple Street Covered Bridge. The highway continues northwest and crosses Tracy Book and Swift Brook on either side of its junction with VT 104A (Highbridge Road), which leads west toward Interstate 89 (I-89) in Georgia.

Near the northwest corner of Fairfax, VT 104 curves west and crosses the Mill River between the two St. Albans reservoirs. The highway passes under I-89 with no access then curves north to parallel the Interstate, during which the route briefly veers to the west of the town line into Georgia. After the short second stint through Fairfax, VT 104 briefly passes through the southwest corner of Fairfield before entering the town of St. Albans, where the highway is named Fairfax Road. The highway crosses Ruggs Brook and briefly becomes a divided highway around its intersection with St. Albans State Highway, a connector between U.S. Route 7 (US 7) in the south end of the city of St. Albans and a trumpet interchange with I-89 immediately to the east of VT 104. VT 104 continues north as Fisher Pond Road beyond its intersection with VT 36 (Fairfield Hill Road) and crosses Stevens Brook. The highway crosses over to the east side of I-89, crosses Hungerford Brook, and reaches its northern terminus at a T-intersection with VT 105 (Sheldon Road), which heads west toward the city of St. Albans and northeast toward Sheldon.

Major intersections

Auxiliary route

Vermont Route 104A (VT 104A) is a  auxiliary route of VT 104 that runs from US 7 in Georgia east to VT 104 in Fairfax. The two-lane highway, which is named Highbridge Road in both towns, begins at US 7 (Ethan Allen Highway) south of the U.S. Highway's interchange with I-89 in Georgia. VT 104A bypasses a loop of Highbridge Road and crosses an arm of Arrowhead Mountain Lake, an impoundment of the Lamoille River. The highway follows the right bank of the river, passes the historic Kemp-Shepard House, and passes under the New England Central Railroad. VT 104A crosses Beaver Meadow Brook and veers away from the river as it enters the town of Fairfax. The highway crosses Swift Brook immediately before it reaches its eastern terminus at VT 104 (Main Street).

References

External links

104
Transportation in Lamoille County, Vermont
Transportation in Franklin County, Vermont